Sir Henry Parkes,  (27 May 1815 – 27 April 1896) was a colonial Australian politician and longest non-consecutive Premier of the Colony of New South Wales, the present-day state of New South Wales in the Commonwealth of Australia. He has been referred to as the "Father of Federation" due to his early promotion for the federation of the six colonies of Australia, as an early critic of British convict transportation and as a proponent for the expansion of the Australian continental rail network.

Parkes delivered his famous Tenterfield Oration in 1889, which yielded a federal conference in 1890 and a Constitutional Convention in 1891, the first of a series of meetings that led to the federation of Australia. He died in 1896, five years before this process was completed. He was described during his lifetime by The Times as "the most commanding figure in Australian politics". Alfred Deakin described Sir Henry Parkes as having flaws but nonetheless being "a large-brained self-educated Titan whose natural field was found in Parliament".

Early life

Parkes was born in Canley (now a suburb of Coventry) in Warwickshire, England, and christened in the nearby village of Stoneleigh. His father, Thomas Parkes, was a small-scale tenant farmer. His mother, Martha Falconbridge, died in 1842 and would serve as the namesake for his home in New South Wales. He received little formal education, and at an early age was working on a ropewalk for 4 pence a day. His next work was in a brickyard, describing it as "breaking stones on the Queen's highway with hardly enough clothing to protect him from the cold". He was then apprenticed to John Holding, a bone and ivory turner at Birmingham, and around 1832 joined the Birmingham political union. Between then and 1838 he was associated with the political movements that aimed to improve living and working conditions for the working classes.

As a young adult, Parkes educated himself by reading extensively, and also developed an interest in poetry. In 1835, he wrote poems (later included in his first volume of poems) that were addressed to Clarinda Varney, the daughter of a local butcher. On 11 July 1836 he married Clarinda Varney and went to live in a single room home. Parkes commenced business on his own account in Birmingham and had a bitter struggle to make ends meet.

Immigration to Australia

After the loss of their two children at an early age and a few unsuccessful weeks living in London, Parkes and his wife emigrated to New South Wales. They travelled aboard the Strathfieldsaye, which arrived at Sydney on 25 July 1839. Another child was born two days before. On arrival they had only a few shillings between them and had to sell their belongings as Parkes looked for work. He was eventually employed as a labourer with John Jamison, one of the colony's wealthiest settlers, on the Regentville estate near Penrith. He was paid with £25 a year and food rations. After spending six months at Regentville, he returned to Sydney and worked in various low-paying jobs, first with an ironmongery store and then with a firm of engineers and brass-founders.

About a year after his arrival in Sydney, Parkes was hired by the New South Wales Customs Department as a Tide Waiter, and given the task of inspecting merchant vessels to guard against smuggling. He had been recommended for this post by Jamison's son-in-law, William John Gibbes, who was the manager of Regentville and the son of Colonel John George Nathaniel Gibbes who led the Customs Department.

Parkes' financial position improved due to his stable new government job, even though he was still burdened with a backlog of undischarged debts. Parkes continued to write poetry. A volume entitled Stolen Moments was published in Sydney in 1842. He met the poet Charles Harpur and William Augustine Duncan, the editor of a local newspaper; he mentions in his Fifty Years of Australian History, that these two men became his "chief advisers in matters of intellectual resource". In early 1846, he left the Customs Department after a disagreement with Colonel Gibbes over a press leak that concerned the alleged behaviour of one of Parkes' co-workers. Despite this, Parkes would continue to remain on friendly terms with Gibbes and his family for the rest of his life. Gibbes' grandson, Frederick Jamison Gibbes, was also a member of the Parliament of New South Wales in the 1880s and like Parkes became a supporter of federation.

After his departure from the Customs Service, Parkes worked in the private sector. He worked as an ivory and bone turner and later ran a shop of his own in Hunter Street. At one stage, he owned several newspapers, including The People's Advocate and New South Wales Vindicator  Empire. He was not successful as a businessman and eventually went bankrupt after running up debts totaling £48,500. He continued to support Australian culture and published poetry in his newspapers.

Early campaigns
During his early years in Australia, Parkes took an interest in political issues. Most notably, he joined the growing movement in the colony for self-governance. This was already a major political issue; the New South Wales Legislative Council had been reformed in 1843 to include elected members for the first time. He also became an opponent of the transportation of convicts to Australia and a supporter of land reform.

He voiced his opinions on political issues in Atlas and the People's Advocate. He first became involved in politics in 1848 when he worked for Robert Lowe in his successful campaign in the Legislative Council elections. The following year, he supported a petition to the Parliament of the United Kingdom for fewer restrictions on voting. He spoke in favour of universal suffrage for the first time. Parkes thought his own speech a very weak performance. The petition succeeded in securing less restrictive voting requirements.

On 8 June 1849, Parkes attended a protest in Circular Quay against the arrival of a convict ship in Sydney. He continued to support the anti-transportation cause with writings and speeches, until the British Government ended almost all transportation to Australia in 1853.

In December 1850, Parkes founded the Empire newspaper. At first a broadsheet only published weekly, it soon became a daily. Parkes was loyal to the British Empire, but also wanted critics of the establishment to have a voice. As a result, the paper became critical of the incumbent Governor Charles Augustus FitzRoy and the rest of the colonial government. He also attacked William Wentworth's plans to introduce self-governance because it proposed an unelected Legislative Council and a restrictive franchise for the elected Legislative Assembly. The proposal was eventually passed after some amendments to make it more democratic. Some years later, Parkes said that, "in the heated opposition to the objectionable parts of Mr Wentworth's scheme, no sufficient attention was given to its great merits".

Election to Legislative Council
Wentworth went to England to support the bill in its passage through the British Parliament in 1854, and resigned his seat as a representative for the City of Sydney. Charles Kemp and Parkes were nominated for the vacancy, and the latter was successful by 1427 votes to 779. Parkes in his election speeches had advocated the extension of the power of the people, increased facilities for education and a bold railway policy.

In any event, Parkes began his political career quietly. He was with the minority faction in the Legislative Council, and he and his political allies could afford to bide their time until the new constitution came into force. His workload at the Empire office was extremely heavy, and in December 1855 he announced his intention of retiring from parliament. He was persuaded to alter his mind, and a month later he stood as a liberal candidate for Sydney City in the New South Wales Legislative Assembly.

Legislative Assembly
The first parliament under responsible government commenced on 22 May 1856 but, for some months, no stable government could be formed. Parkes was once offered office but declined as he felt he would be deserting his friends. The Empire was not profitable despite its reputation. Around the end of 1856, he resigned his seat to focus on saving the newspaper business. He was not successful, and the liabilities of the paper amounted to £50,000. Though his friends tried to ease the situation by advancing the sum required to pay off a mortgage of £11,000 in 1858, the position became hopeless.

Early in that year, Parkes had entered the Legislative Assembly again, this time as member for the North Riding of Cumberland.  Parkes sat in this parliament for about six months but then resigned at the end of August 1858 on account of his insolvency. His liabilities were estimated at £50,000 and his assets at £48,500. The issuing of a certificate of insolvency was bitterly opposed and the proceedings were long drawn out. An investigation of Parkes' accounts found he had generally acted under the advice of his banker, and he was ultimately exonerated by the chief commissioner in insolvency of any fraudulent intent.

First Parliament
Relieved of his heavy work on the Empire, which was continued in other hands, Parkes stood for parliament and was elected for East Sydney on 10 June 1854. He stood as an independent candidate, but in the list of candidates elected he was described by the Sydney Morning Herald as a "radical". He was generally in favour of Sir John Robertson's land policy, of the extension of education, and of free trade. He was a strong supporter of free trade, immigration programmes and education reforms. He was also strongly in favour of developing manufactures as he was of encouraging agriculture. He introduced laws that gave the Government the power to employ teachers and create public schools, abolished government funding to religious schools and improved prisons.

Parkes also believed in immigration, and his well-known powers as an orator led to his being sent to England with William Dalley as commissioners of emigration at a salary of £1000 a year each in May 1861. Parkes left his wife and five, soon to become six, children in poverty, on a rented farm at Werrington. Their duties were confined to diffusing information, and Parkes spoke at about 60 meetings at towns in the west and north of England and in Scotland. He felt that he had done good work, but it was difficult to say how much effect his words had. During the 14 months he was in England he met Thomas Carlyle. He returned to Australia in January 1863.

In August he opposed J. B. Darvall at East Maitland and was defeated; but in the following year, was elected for Kiama. In January 1866 the premier, Charles Cowper, resigned in consequence of an amendment moved by Parkes having been carried. Strictly speaking the governor should have asked Parkes whether he could form a government, but Sir James Martin was sent for and Parkes was given the position of Colonial Secretary. This ministry remained in office for nearly three years, from January 1866 to October 1868. An important piece of legislation carried through was the Public Schools Act 1866, introduced by Parkes, which required teachers to have training and created a funding mechanism. A council of education was formed, and for the first four years after the passing of the act Parkes filled the office of president. As a result of the act, many new schools were established all over the colony. Parkes also initiated the introduction of nurses from England trained by Florence Nightingale.

In 1867 to 1868 Alfred, Duke of Edinburgh (Queen Victoria's second oldest son) visited the Australian colonies. On 12 March 1868 the Duke was shot in the back by one Henry James O'Farrell. The would-be assassin was Irish, and at the time claimed he was a Fenian. The wound, while painful, was not fatal. Despite the Duke's requests for leniency, the colonial government allowed O'Farrell to be executed. O'Farrell had, in the meantime, admitted he was not really a member of the Fenians, but by the time of the execution other acts of violence connected with the Fenians (most notably the murder of D'Arcy McGee in Canada) spurred anti-Fenian and anti-Irish Catholic feelings. Parkes pushed anti-Fenianism hard. For a while his claims of a vast Fenian conspiracy in New South Wales gained some traction, but when nothing further occurred public opinion began to reverse and he was accused of being anti-Irish. As a result, his political position was weakened.

He resigned from the Martin ministry in September 1868, and for the next three and a half years was out of office. In the first year of the Robertson government he moved a want-of-confidence motion which was defeated by four votes. Parkes continued to be one of the most conspicuous figures in the house, and at the 1869 election was returned at the head of the poll for East Sydney.

Resignation, re-election and first premiership

In 1870, Henry Parkes was again in financial difficulties and was obliged to resign his seat. He had been in business as a merchant in a comparatively large way, and when declared insolvent he had liabilities of £32,000 and assets of £13,300. He was at once re-elected for Kiama, but an extremely hostile article in the Sydney Morning Herald led to his resigning again. The suggestion had been made that his presence in the assembly while in the insolvency court might influence the officials. 

His ongoing financial woes had become a matter of some public notoriety, causing the barrister and fellow politician, William Dalley, to remark of Parkes, in 1872, that, "If he lives long, he will rule not over a nation of admirers and friends, but of creditors".

It was not until December 1871 that a seat could be found for him and he was then elected at a by-election for Mudgee. The Martin-Robertson ministry had involved itself in a dispute with the colony of Victoria over a question of border duties, and Parkes effectively threw ridicule on the proceedings. When parliament met, the government was defeated and a dissolution was granted. In the general election which followed in which Parkes was generally recognised as the leader of the opposition, and the ministry was defeated at the polls. When parliament assembled, Parkes (now back representing East Sydney) was elected leader of the opposition. The acting-governor had sent for William Forster before parliament met, but he was unable to form a ministry, and in May 1872 Parkes formed his first ministry which was to last for nearly three years.

Parkes had always supported free trade, and his convictions were strengthened during a visit to England when he met Cobden and other leading advocates. During his first administration, he reduced the duties in New South Wales that practically it became a free trade colony. Generally there was a forward policy. His government also sponsored the building of railway and telegraph lines and reduced some taxes.

In 1873 the retirement of Sir Alfred Stephen, the Chief Justice, led Parkes into controversy. Parkes appears to have encouraged his Attorney-General, E. Butler to believe that he would be appointed Chief Justice of New South Wales. Opposition developed in many quarters and Parkes decided to appoint Sir James Martin instead. When the announcement of his appointment was made on 11 November 1873, Butler took the opportunity to make a statement, read publicly the correspondence between Parkes and himself, and resigned his seat in the cabinet. Parkes was accused of manoeuvring to get rid of Butler, who was seen as an opponent within Parkes' faction, but no evidence was found to support this.

The ministry continued to government, though it did not succeed in creating an elected upper house. Two or three unsuccessful attempts were made to oust the government without success, but in February 1875, Governor Robinson's decision to release of the bushranger Frank Gardiner led to the defeat of the ministry. Subsequent discussions between Robinson, Parkes and the Colonial Office clarified the governor's responsibilities in pardoning prisoners.

Second premiership

When Parkes was defeated Robertson came into power, and for the next two years little was done of real importance. Parkes became tired of his position as leader of the opposition and resigned early in 1877. In March, the Robertson ministry was defeated and Parkes formed one which lasted five months. The parties were equally divided and business was sometimes at a standstill. Parkes said of this ministry that it had "as smooth a time as the toad under the harrow". Robertson returned to the Premiership from August to December 1877, including an election in October.

Parkes was returned for Canterbury. James Squire Farnell then formed a stop-gap ministry which existed for a year from December 1877 to December 1878. In the middle of this year Parkes made a tour of the western districts of the colony speaking at many country centres. This gave him many opportunities of criticising the government then in power. At the end of the year it was defeated, but the situation was still obscure, because the parties led by Robertson and Parkes were nearly equal.

Third premiership

Robertson tried to form a government but failed, and tired of the unsatisfactory position which he was confronted with, resigned his seat in the Legislative Assembly. He was then approached by Parkes, and a government was formed with Robertson as vice-president of the Executive Council and representative of the government in the Upper House. The combination was unexpected, due to Parkes' rivalry with Robertson; nonetheless it produced two years of stable government after years of instability. It amended the electoral law, brought in a new education act, improved the water-supply and sewerage systems, appointed stipendiary magistrates, and regulated the liability of employers with regard to injuries to workers. In the 1880 election, Parkes was returned for St Leonards. When the Parkes Government left office in there was a large surplus in the New South Wales Treasury. Towards the end of 1881 Parkes was in bad health. He still kept up his habit of working long hours, and except for week-end visits to his house in the mountains he had no relaxation. It was suggested that a grant should be made by Parliament to enable him to go away on a voyage, but he declined to allow this to be brought forward. He also vetoed a suggestion that a substantial testimonial should be presented to him by his friends.

Parkes decided to visit England at his own expenses. He stayed in America for about six weeks on his way to Europe and did his best to make Australia better known. In England, he was received as an honoured guest. Parkes argued in favour of good relations between England and her colonies while also arguing for their right to self-determination; "the softer the cords" he said "the stronger will be the union between us". Among the friends he made in England was Tennyson, and Lord Leigh, being aware that Parkes had been born at Stoneleigh, invited him to stay at Stoneleigh Abbey. Parkes was able to visit the farmhouse where he was born and the church where he was christened. On his way home, he visited Melbourne where he was given a banquet on 15 August 1882. Two days later he was back in Sydney.

Electoral defeat
When Parkes returned, the government was apparently in no danger, and the topic of political debate turned to land reform. This aimed to reduce the amount of land that was in the hands of the large graziers and reduce dummying. Parkes had argued for land reform as far back as 1877, and Robertson's bill only proposed comparatively unimportant amendments. The government was defeated over the issue, a dissolution was obtained. Parkes' faction was not only defeated, but Parkes lost his own seat at East Sydney. He was soon returned to Parliament in another constituency (Tenterfield) but he took little interest in politics for some time. He went to England as representative of a Sydney financial company and did not return until August 1884, having been absent 14 months. In November, he resigned his seat and announced his retirement from politics.

He was now 70 years old. He opened an office in Pitt Street as representative of the financial association which had sent him to England, and remained in this position until 1887. He could not, however, keep long away from politics. At the beginning of 1885 W. B. Dalley, while acting-premier, offered a contingent of troops to go to the Sudan and the offer was accepted. Parkes strongly disapproved and, though public opinion was against him, on 31 March he won a by-election in Argyle. When he took his seat in September objection was taken to claims of parliamentary corruption he had made when resigning from Parliament in 1884, and Sir Alexander Stuart moved a resolution affirming that the words he had used were a gross libel on the house. His motion was carried by four votes. Parkes did not apologise, but his ministry was discouraged from going further. One of the supporters of the ministry moved that Parkes should be expelled but only obtained the support of his seconder.

Fourth premiership

In October 1885 parliament was dissolved, the government was reconstructed and George Dibbs became Premier of New South Wales. At the election Parkes stood against Dibbs at St Leonards, and defeated him by 476 votes. Among the reasons for Parkes' victory were his campaign for a bridge across the harbour, and a railway line going inland from North Shore. The ministry was defeated and was succeeded by a Robertson ministry which lasted only two months. The next ministry, under Sir Patrick Jennings, lasted nine months and was defeated in January 1887. In the meantime, Robertson had retired from politics and Parkes, as leader of the opposition, formed a ministry and obtained a dissolution. He fought a strenuous campaign pointing out that in the four years since he was last in office, the public debt had more than doubled and the surplus of £2,000,000 had become a deficit of £2,500,000. He proposed to do away with the recent increase in duties, to bring in an amended land act, and to create a body to control the railways free of political influence. Parkes' faction won a narrow majority. When parliament met, free trade was soon restored and there was a well-meant but abortive inquiry into the state of the civil service.

Parkes campaigned against Chinese immigration at the point when it became a political issue. He was received with "loud and continuous cheers" in the Legislative Assembly when he spoke of the need "to terminate a moral and social pestilence, and preserve to ourselves and to our children unaltered and unspotted the rights and privileges which we have received from our forefathers". Along with many politicians of his day, Parkes avoided the claim that the Chinese and other Asians should be excluded because they were an "inferior" race. Some years before, he had said of them: "They are a superior set of people . . . a nation of an old and deep-rooted civilisation. . . . It is because I believe the Chinese to be a powerful race capable of taking a great hold upon the country, and because I want to preserve the type of my own nation . . . that I am and always have been opposed to the influx of Chinese." In spite of some discouragement from the British Government, he succeeded in passing an act of parliament which raised the entrance tax to £100 per head.

Though Parkes was personally opposed to it, a payment of members act was passed, and two important and valuable measures, the Government Railways Act and the Public Works Act both became law. The government, however, was defeated on allegations that W. M. Fehon, whom he had appointed a rail commissioner, was corrupt. His wife Clarinda Varney (after whom Clarinda Falls at Faulconbridge, New South Wales were named) died in 1888. A year later, he married Eleanor Dixon.

Fifth premiership and Federation

At the ensuing election Parkes was returned with a small majority and formed his fifth administration, which began in March 1889 and lasted until October 1891. The proposal to join the colonies of Australia into a federation became a major political issue. As far back as 1867, Parkes had said at an intercolonial conference: "I think the time has arrived when these colonies should be united by some federal bond of connexion." Shortly afterwards, a bill to establish the proposed federal council was introduced by him and passed through both the New South Wales houses. This was afterwards shelved by the action of the Secretary of State for the Colonies. Various other conferences were held in the next 20 years at which the question came up, in which Parkes took a leading part, but in October 1884 he was blowing cold and suggesting that it would be "better to let the idea of federation mature in men's minds", and New South Wales then stood out of the proposed federal council scheme.

In October 1889 a report on the defences of Australia suggested among other things the federation of the forces of all the Australian colonies and a uniform gauge for railways. Parkes had come to the conclusion that the time had come for a new federal movement.
He now felt more confidence in the movement and on 15 October 1889 telegraphed to the premiers of the other colonies suggesting a conference.

On 24 October 1889, at the Tenterfield School of Arts, Parkes delivered the Tenterfield Oration. The oration was seen as a clarion call to federalists and he called for a convention "to devise the constitution which would be necessary for bringing into existence a federal government with a federal parliament for the conduct of national undertaking".

Parkes convened the 1890 Federation Conference of February 1890 and may be considered the first real step towards Federation. In May he moved resolutions in the assembly approving of the proceedings of the conference that had just been held in Melbourne, and appointing him and three other members' delegates to the Sydney 1891 National Australasian Convention. On 18 May he broke his leg and was laid up for some time. It was 14 weeks before he was able to be assisted to his seat in the house. When the convention met on 2 March 1891 Parkes was appointed as its president. The next business was the debating of a series of resolutions proposed by Parkes as a preliminary interchange of ideas and a laying down of guiding principles. It was at this convention that the first draft of a bill to constitute the Commonwealth of Australia was framed. Parkes proposed the name of Commonwealth of Australia for the new nation.

When it was about to be submitted to the New South Wales assembly, George Reid on the address-in-reply moved an amendment hostile to the bill. Parkes then announced that in view of Reid's amendment he proposed to put the federal bill third on the list. Dibbs moved a vote of no confidence, defeated only on the casting vote of the speaker, and Parkes resigned on 22 October 1891.

On the Backbench

Parkes, now 77 years old, was replaced by Reid as the leader of the free traders, and he henceforth sat as an independent member. Parkes' political energies were now wholly occupied by Federation. In response to pressure from Parkes, Reid endorsed a scheme of a second, directly elected federal convention, followed by a referendum. Parkes had already mooted a referendum, but strongly favoured a convention delegates being chosen by premiers, rather than elected by the public. In quest of his political enemy, Parkes stood against Reid at the 1895 general election for Sydney-King, winning 44 percent of the vote. In 1896 he sought to re-enter parliament at the bye-election for the seat of Waverley, winning just 11.5 percent of the vote. This proved to be the anti-climactic end of his 40 year long career in the New South Wales Parliament.   

In 1887, a sum of £9000 had been collected by his friends and placed in the hands of trustees for investment. From this fund he had been receiving an income of over £500 a year, but the financial crisis of 1893 reduced this to little more than £200. Parkes was obliged to sell his collection of autograph letters and many other things that he valued, to provide for his household. A movement was made in December 1895 to obtain a grant for him from the government but nothing had been done when he fell ill in April 1896. Towards the end of his life, Parkes resided at Kenilworth, a Gothic mansion in Johnston Street, Annandale, a Sydney suburb. Its owner sought the prestige of having Parkes as a tenant,and gave favourable terms. 

He died on 27 April; by that time he was living in poverty. He was survived by his third wife, five daughters and one son of the first marriage, and five sons and one daughter by the second. One of his sons, Varney Parkes, an architect, entered parliament and was postmaster-general in the Reid ministry from August 1898 to September 1899. Another, Cobden Parkes, eventually became the New South Wales Government Architect. Parkes had left directions that his funeral should be as simple as possible; a state funeral was declined, but a very large number of people attended when he was placed by the side of his first wife at Faulconbridge in the grounds of his former home in the Blue Mountains. His portrait by the artist Julian Ashton is in a public collection in Sydney.

Evaluations
Parkes was described during his lifetime by The Times as "the most commanding figure in Australian politics". Alfred Deakin described him as "though not rich or versatile, his personality was massive, durable and imposing, resting upon elementary qualities of human nature elevated by a strong mind. He was cast in the mould of a great man and though he suffered from numerous pettinesses, spites and failings, he was in himself a large-brained self-educated Titan whose natural field was found in Parliament and whose resources of character and intellect enabled him in his later years to overshadow all his contemporaries".

Five years after Parkes' death, Australia became a federation on 1 January 1901. The negotiations to form the federation followed directly from the conferences that Parkes had instigated.

Parkes was known for his commanding personality and skills as an orator, despite having a minor speech impediment with controlling aspirates. He spoke to his supporters in plain, down-to-earth language, and pursued his causes with great determination. Some of his acquaintances perceived him as being vain, temperamental and even rude. Despite this, he had a warm reception when he met Thomas Carlyle and Alfred, Lord Tennyson while visiting the UK. He was interested in early Australian literary men, having been a friend of both Harpur and Kendall. He had received almost no formal education, but educated himself by reading widely.

Parkes was not successful as a businessman or at managing his personal finances, and he had little wealth at the time of his death. On the other hand, his governments managed their finances well, largely due to the treasurers he appointed. Although he was not a socialist, he supported improving the living standards of the working class. He was less ambitious with social reform legislation in the later years of his career, due to the strong conservative opposition he encountered. In 1891, as Premier, he repulsed as "barbarous" a proposal to remove from Aboriginals the right to vote.

Marriages and children
Parkes was first married to Clarinda Varney on 11 July 1836 in Birmingham. She died on 2 February 1888 in Balmain, New South Wales, aged 74. They had twelve children:

 Thomas Campbell Parkes (18 April 1837 – 5 May 1837), born and died in Birmingham aged 17 days.
 Clarinda Martha Parkes (23 June 1838 – 24 June 1838), born and died in Birmingham aged one day.
 Clarinda Sarah Parkes (23 July 1839 – 11 October 1915), married William Thom and had issue.
 Robert Sydney Parkes (21 December 1843 – 2 January 1880), married and had issue.
 Mary Parkes (16 February 1846 – 5 December 1846), died aged under 10 months.
 Mary Edith Parkes (3 March 1848 – 15 December 1919), married George Murray and had issue.
 Milton Parkes (14 December 1849 – 19 January 1851), died aged 13 months.
 Lily Maria Parkes (27 October 1851 – 25 March 1854), died aged 2 years.
 Annie Thomasine Parkes (9 January 1854 – 6 February 1929), remained unmarried.
 Gertrude Amelia Parkes (13 April 1856 – 31 July 1921), married Robert Hiscox and had issue.
 Varney Parkes (4 June 1859 – 14 May 1935), married firstly Mary Murray and then her sister Isabella Murray, and had issue. An architect and Member of the New South Wales Legislative Assembly.
 Lily Faulconbridge Parkes (7 February 1862 – 14 October 1932), remained unmarried.
After his first wife's death, Parkes married Eleanor Dixon on 6 February 1889 in Sydney. They remained married until her death on 16 July 1895 in Annandale, New South Wales, aged 38. They had five children, three born before their marriage:
 Sydney Parkes (1884 – 20 April 1937), married Marion Edith Morrissey and had issue.
 Kenilworth Parkes (1886 – 4 November 1910), married Maude Howard (later Armstrong) and had issue.
 Aurora Parkes (1888 – 29 October 1974), married Emanuel Evans, without issue.
 Henry Parkes (1890 – 8 July 1954), married Katherine Rush and had issue.
 Cobden Parkes (2 August 1892 – 15 August 1978), married Victoria Lillyman and had issue. Public servant and New South Wales Government Architect.
Parkes married thirdly in Parramatta on 23 October 1895 to Julia Lynch, his 23-year-old former cook and housekeeper. They had no children, but Lady Parkes raised her stepchildren from Sir Henry's second marriage. They remained married until his death a year later. Lady (Julia) Parkes died on 11 July 1919 in Lewisham, New South Wales.

Honours
Henry Parkes was created Knight Commander of the Order of St Michael and St George in 1877, and Knight Grand Cross of the same order in 1888.

His image appears on the Australian one-dollar coin of 1996; and on the Centenary of Federation commemoration Australian $5 note issued in 2001.

Literary works

Parkes' literary work includes six volumes of verse, Stolen Moments (1842), Murmurs of the Stream (1857), Studies in Rhyme (1870), The Beauteous Terrorist and Other Poems (1885), Fragmentary Thoughts (1889), Sonnets and Other Verses (1895). Although critical reception of his poetry was often negative, some of his poems have been included in Australian anthologies. His prose work includes Australian Views of England (1869), and his autobiographical Fifty Years in the Making of Australian History (1892). A collection of his Speeches on Various Occasions, delivered between 1848 and 1874, was published in 1876, and another collection dealing mostly with federation appeared in 1890 under the title of The Federal Government of Australasia. In 1896, shortly after his death, An Emigrant's Home Letters, a small collection of Parkes' letters to his family in England between 1838 and 1843, was published at Sydney, edited by his daughter, Annie T. Parkes.

Individual poems

 "The Buried Chief" (1886)
 "Weary" (1892)

Named after Sir Henry Parkes
 Parkes, New South Wales, a regional town.
 Parkeston, Western Australia, an outlying area of Kalgoorlie.
 Parkes Observatory, a radio telescope near Parkes, New South Wales.
 Parkes, Australian Capital Territory, a suburb of Canberra.
 Parkes Way, an arterial road in Canberra.
 the Division of Parkes (1901-69), an abolished Sydney electorate in the Australian House of Representatives.
 the Division of Parkes, a current regional electorate in the House of Representatives.
 the Tenterfield School of Arts museum and theatre complex, also known as the Sir Henry Parkes School of Arts, a museum in the building where Parkes made the famous "Tenterfield Oration", in Tenterfield, New South Wales, Australia.
the Sir Henry Parkes Memorial School in Tenterfield, New South Wales, Australia.
 , a Royal Australian Navy corvette during World War II.
 Sir Henry Parkes Avenue, New South Wales

He is also commemorated in his birthplace Canley, Coventry by the naming of a road (Sir Henry Parkes Road) and a school (Sir Henry Parkes Primary School) in Coventry. Canley railway station also commemorates the link with Sir Henry Parkes with Australian-themed decor.

See also
 Chief Secretary's Building – The office building Parkes worked in, and helped design and furnish
 First Parkes ministry (1872–1876)
 Second Parkes ministry (1877)
 Third Parkes ministry (1878–1883)
 Fourth Parkes ministry (1887–1889)
 Fifth Parkes ministry (1889–1891)

References

Further reading
 Dando-Collins, Stephen (2013). 'Sir Henry Parkes, the Australian Colossus'. Sydney: Knopf. The most up-to-date biography. . 
 
 Martin, A.W. Henry Parkes: a Biography (Melbourne University Press, 1980).online edition at ACLS E-Books
 McKinlay, Brian (1971). The First Royal Tour, 1867–1868. London: Robert Hale, 200p. .
 Travers, Robert (1986). The Phantom Fenians of New South Wales. Sydney: Kangaroo Press, 176p. .
 Travers, Robert (1992). The Grand Old Man of Australian Politics: The Life and Times of Sir Henry Parkes. Sydney: Kangaroo Press. .

Primary sources
 Parkes, Henry. Fifty Years in the Making of Australian History (1892), memoir online
 Parkes, Henry, and Annie T. Parkes. An Emigrant's Home Letters (1896) 164 pages  online edition
 Parkes, Henry. Speeches on Various Occasions Connected with the Public Affairs of New South Wales (1876) 464 pages;  online edition
 Parkes, Henry. The Federal Government of Australasia: Speeches.... (1890) 189 pages; online edition

External links

 Parkes, Henry (Sir) (1815–1896) National Library of Australia, Trove, People and Organisation record for Henry Parkes
 National Library of Australia
 Discovering Democracy
 historical feature- Sir Henry Parkes
 Henry Parkes Foundation website
 
 

1815 births
1896 deaths
19th-century Australian politicians
Australian federationists
Australian Knights Grand Cross of the Order of St Michael and St George
Colonial Secretaries of New South Wales
English emigrants to Australia
Free Trade Party politicians
Members of the New South Wales Legislative Assembly
Members of the New South Wales Legislative Council
Premiers of New South Wales
People from Coventry
People from the Blue Mountains (New South Wales)
Australian newspaper editors
Australian waterside workers
Australian monarchists